Otomyini is an Old World tribe of muroid rodents in the subfamily Murinae. Musser and Carleton (2005) granted it subfamily status (Otomyinae), but molecular studies consistently show that the otomyines evolved from within the Murinae, leading these researchers to subsume it in this subfamily, sometimes with tribal status (Jansa and Weksler, 2004; Michaux et al., 2001; Steppan et al., 2004).  It includes 3 genera.

References
Jansa, S. A. and M. Weksler. Phylogeny of muroid rodents: relationships within and among major lineages as determined by IRBP gene sequences.  Molecular Phylogenetics and Evolution, 31:256-276.
Michaux, J., A. Reyes, and F. Catzeflis. 2001. Evolutionary history of the most speciose mammals: molecular phylogeny of muroid rodents. Molecular Biology and Evolution, 17:280-293.
Musser, G. G. and M. D. Carleton. 2005. Superfamily Muroidea. pp. 894–1531 in Mammal Species of the World a Taxonomic and Geographic Reference. D. E. Wilson and D. M. Reeder eds. Johns Hopkins University Press, Baltimore.
Steppan, S. J., R. A. Adkins, and J. Anderson. 2004. Phylogeny and divergence date estimates of rapid radiations in muroid rodents based on multiple nuclear genes. Systematic Biology, 53:533-553.

Old World rats and mice
Mammal tribes